The 2021 Judo Grand Prix Zagreb was held in Zagreb, Croatia, from 24 to 26 September 2021.

Event videos
The event will air freely on the IJF YouTube channel.

Medal summary

Men's events

Women's events

Source Results

Medal table

Prize money
The sums written are per medalist, bringing the total prizes awarded to 98,000€.

References

External links
 

2021 IJF World Tour
2021 Judo Grand Prix
Grand Prix 2021
Judo
Judo
Judo
Judo